Dawn Yeoh (born 5 May 1986), is a Singaporean actress and was named as one of the Seven Princesses of Mediacorp in 2006.

Early life 
Yeoh was educated in Jurong Primary School , Clementi Town Secondary School & Ngee Ann Polytechnic.

Career
Yeoh started her career in The Shining Star where she played a lead role. She went on to play a supporting role in Honour and Passion, and was involved in a production called Taste of Love. In 2009, she was involved in Crime Buster x2, Beach.Ball.Babes and Malaysian production The Beautiful Scent. She filmed The Dream Catchers and Your Hand In Mine. She was nominated for the Star Awards for Top 10 Most Popular Female Artistes in 2007 and 2009. Yeoh appeared in Peace & Prosperity, Crescendo, Let It Go, 118, Disclosed and The Dream Makers.

In 2018, Yeoh appeared in Gifted, Limited Edition & Jalan Jalan. In 2019, she appeared in My Agent Is My Hero 2 & Remember Us This Way.

Filmography

Television

Awards and nominations

References

External links
 

Living people
1986 births
Singaporean actresses